A rare sugar is a sugar that occurs in limited quantities in nature. Rare sugars can be made using enzymes, choosing which enzymes to use if you know the substrate can be aided by the Izumoring-strategy.

Specific examples of rare sugars are:

 Allulose
 Allose
 Sorbose
 Tagatose

References

Carbohydrates